Elmer Peterson (November 20, 1892 – ?) was an American farmer and politician.

Early years
Born in Martin County, Minnesota, Peterson was raised in Rockford, Illinois and attended Brown's Business College in Rockford. He served in the United States Army during World War I. He lived in Superior, Wisconsin and was a farmer.

Career
He served as the town clerk, on the school board, and on the Douglas County, Wisconsin Board of Supervisors. Peterson served in the Wisconsin State Assembly from 1933 to 1941. He then served in the Wisconsin Senate, representing the 11th District from 1943 to 1947. He was a member of the Wisconsin Progressive Party.

References

1892 births
Year of death missing
People from Rockford, Illinois
People from Martin County, Minnesota
Politicians from Superior, Wisconsin
Military personnel from Wisconsin
Farmers from Wisconsin
County supervisors in Wisconsin
School board members in Wisconsin
Members of the Wisconsin State Assembly
Wisconsin state senators
Wisconsin Progressives (1924)
20th-century American politicians